Saint Gordianus, commemorated 17 September, suffered martyrdom (place uncertain) with two companions

References

Christian martyrs

Christian saints in unknown century
Year of birth unknown
Year of death unknown